Devil in the Flesh is an Australian film adapted from the French novel Le Diable au corps. It is directed by Scott Murray, who is best known for being the editor of Cinema Papers.

Murray adapted the film to be set in rural Victoria during World War II.

Shooting and Release
The film was shot over seven weeks in central Victoria in towns such as Bendigo, Castlemaine, and Dunolly, starting 1 May 1985. Its working title was Marie-Claire.

The film was screened at the 25th International Critics' Week of the 1986 Cannes Film Festival, but it didn't get a theatrical release till early 1989.

References

External links

Devil in the Flesh at Oz Movies

1989 romantic drama films
1989 films
Australian romantic drama films
Australian World War II films
Films set in Victoria (Australia)
Films shot in Victoria (Australia)
Films based on French novels
Films based on romance novels
1980s English-language films
1980s Australian films